The 1959 NCAA Golf Championship was the 21st annual NCAA-sanctioned golf tournament to determine the individual and team national champions of men's collegiate golf in the United States.

The tournament was held at Eugene Country Club in Eugene, Oregon, hosted by the University of Oregon.

Three-time defending champions Houston won the team title, the Cougars' fourth NCAA team national title.

Individual results

Individual champion
 Dick Crawford, Houston

Tournament medalists
 Bob Pratt, Houston (136)
 Jack Cupit, Houston (136)

Team results

Note: Top 10 only
DC = Defending champions

References

NCAA Men's Golf Championship
Golf in Oregon
NCAA Golf Championship
NCAA Golf Championship
NCAA Golf Championship